Clarence and Darling Downs was an electoral district of the Legislative Assembly in the Australian colony of New South Wales from 1856 to 1859.  It included the Clarence Valley and the Darling Downs region. For the 1859 New South Wales colonial election The New South Wales part of the electorate was replaced by The Clarence while the Darling Downs was briefly a separate electorate prior to the separation of Queensland in December 1859.

Members for Clarence and Darling Downs

Election results

1856

1858

References

Clarence and Darling Downs
Clarence and Darling Downs
History of Queensland
1856 establishments in Australia
1859 disestablishments in Australia
Constituencies established in 1856
Constituencies disestablished in 1859